Vladimir Mikhailovich Lushin (born 10 September 1962) is a former Russian football player and referee.

Referee career
Assistant referee
Russian Third League: 1996–1997
Russian Second Division: 1997–2001
Russian First Division: 1997–2001

Referee
Russian Third League: 1996–1997
Russian Second Division: 1997–2006
Russian First Division: 2000–2006

References

1962 births
Living people
Soviet footballers
Soviet Top League players
FC Rostov players
FC SKA Rostov-on-Don players
FC Spartak Vladikavkaz players
FC Chernomorets Novorossiysk players
FC Kuban Krasnodar players
FC Metallurg Lipetsk players
FC Zhemchuzhina Sochi players
Russian footballers
Russian Premier League players
Russian football referees

Association football defenders